The Three Faces of Chico is an album by the drummer and bandleader Chico Hamilton, recorded in 1959 and released on the Warner Bros. label.

Reception

The AllMusic review by Matt Collar says, "This is a highly recommended set of progressive late-'50s modern jazz."

A writer for Billboard called the recording "a versatile album with jockey appeal," and wrote: "In addition to his flashy virtuosity as a drummer on this LP, Hamilton displays an interesting vocal talent... his quintet... swings effectively."

Track listing
All compositions by Chico Hamilton except as indicated
 "Miss Movement" (Eric Dolphy) - 2:16
 "She's Funny That Way" (Richard A. Whiting, Neil Moret) - 2:49	
 "Trinkets" - 4:27
 "More Than You Know" (Vincent Youmans, Billy Rose, Edward Eliscu) - 5:53
 "The Best Things in Life Are Free" (Buddy DeSylva, Lew Brown, Ray Henderson) - 2:37
 "Where or When" (Richard Rodgers, Lorenz Hart) - 2:25	
 "Happy Little Dance" - 2:14
 "Newport News" (Kenny Dorham) - 4:37
 "I Don't Know Why (I Just Do)" (Fred E. Ahlert, Roy Turk) - 2:56
 "No Speak No English, Man" - 0:26

Personnel
Chico Hamilton - drums, vocals
Eric Dolphy - alto saxophone, bass clarinet, flute 
Paul Horn - alto saxophone (tracks 2, 5, 6 & 9)
Buddy Collette - tenor saxophone (tracks 2, 5, 6 & 9)
Bill Green - baritone saxophone (tracks 2, 5, 6 & 9)
Nathan Gershman - cello
Dennis Budimir - guitar
Wyatt Ruther - double bass

References 

1959 albums
Chico Hamilton albums
Warner Records albums